Hendrik Martenszoon Sorgh (c. 1610 – buried 28 June 1670) was a Dutch Golden Age painter of genre works.

Biography
Born in Rotterdam, Sorgh became a pupil of David Teniers the Younger and Willem Pieterszoon Buytewech. Sorgh painted mostly interiors with peasants.  His kitchen interiors feature elaborate still lifes.  He also painted market scenes, portraits, and marine and historical scenes.
Sorgh's works include, for example, A Man Writing, Interior with Jacob and Esau, and A Kitchen.

He married Adriaantje Hollaer on 20 February 1633. She became famous in 1947 because of her marriage portrait which had been painted by Rembrandt and was pictured on the Dutch 100-guilder banknote, printed from 1947 - 1950. Through her sister, he was brother-in-law to his friend the painter Crijn Hendricksz Volmarijn. Her portrait by Rembrandt was long considered a pendant companion to a portrait of him, but it is no longer certain since an 18th-century engraving of that portrait held the caption Nicholas Berchem. The engraved portrait of him in Arnold Houbraken's The Great Theatre of Dutch Painters was based on his self-portrait, currently in a private collection.

In 1659 he became headman of the Rotterdam Guild of St. Luke. His pupils were Jacobus Blauvoet, Abraham Diepraam, Cornelis Dorsman, Pieter Nijs, and Pieter Crijnse Volmarijn.

There is also a painting by Hendrick Sorgh in the Hunterian Art Gallery ("Interior with Card Players") in Glasgow, Scotland.

References

External links
 Works and literature on Hendrik Martenszoon Sorgh
 Vermeer and The Delft School, exhibition catalog fully online as PDF from The Metropolitan Museum of Art, which contains material on Hendrik Martenszoon Sorgh (see index)
 The Milkmaid by Johannes Vermeer, exhibition catalog fully online as PDF from The Metropolitan Museum of Art, which contains material on Hendrik Martenszoon Sorgh (cat. no. 5)

Dutch Golden Age painters
Dutch male painters
1610 births
1670 deaths
Painters from Rotterdam